Although most Baptist groups are congregationalist in polity, some have different ecclesiastical organization and adopt an episcopal polity governance. In those churches the local congregation has less autonomy and the bishop oversees them, assigning pastors and distributing funds.

Evangelical Baptist Union of Georgia
The Evangelical Baptist Union of Georgia have an episcopal polity, with an archbishop as the primate.  Archbishop Malkhaz Songulashvili, pastor of the Cathedral of Tbilisi is a charismatic figure and social activist.

Union of Baptist Churches in Latvia
The Baptists of Latvia are result from a revival among German and Latvian Lutherans and organized their first church in 1861. The union is headed by a bishop.

Episcopal Baptist Church in Congo
The Église Épiscopale Baptiste is a Baptist denomination in Democratic Republic of the Congo. It began with evangelical missionaries who accepted the Baptist doctrines and organized this denomination retaining the episcopal polity. The Church became autonomous in 1956.

In 2007 there were ten bishops, and 105,000 baptized members in 110 territorial parishes. Most of them were in the nine provinces of DRC and some in Angola and Zambia. The pastor are under supervision from the bishops, who assign them a church.

The EPB is a member of the World Council of Churches and the Église du Christ au Congo.

Among African-American Baptists
A few African-American Baptist congregations have ordained or started calling their senior minister bishop, but without changing congregational polity.

India
The uniting Church of North India received Baptists when in its constitution and had the Baptist Samson Das ordained Bishop of Cuttack in 2006.

References

External links
   Evangelical Baptist Church of Georgia
  Bishop ordained in Virginia 

Baptist denominations
Christian denominations established in the 19th century
Christian denominations established in the 20th century
Protestantism in the Democratic Republic of the Congo
Protestantism in Georgia (country)